Mohamed Salem (born 18 December 1994), is an Egyptian footballer who plays for Egyptian Premier League side Al Mokawloon Al Arab SC as a forward.

References

1994 births
Living people
Egyptian footballers
Association football forwards
Egypt international footballers
Egypt youth international footballers
2015 Africa U-23 Cup of Nations players
Egyptian Premier League players
Al Mokawloon Al Arab SC players
Zamalek SC players
Al Ittihad Alexandria Club players
Petrojet SC players
El Dakhleya SC players